Superliga de Voleibol Masculina 2014–15 was the 51st (LI) season since its establishment. The 2014–15 regular season started on October 11, 2014, and finished on March 28, 2015.

Championship playoffs began on 11 April. Starting with semifinals, the two semifinal winners will advance to the Final to fight for the championship title to the best of three matches.

Unicaja Almería won the championship by defeating 2013–14 season defending champions CAI Teruel, 3–1 in the Championship Final.

Competition format 
11 teams played in a two-rounds format. Upon completion of regular season, the top four teams play Championship's playoffs, while the bottom team is relegated to Superliga 2.

During regular season, a win by 3–0 or 3–1 means 3 points to winner team, while a 3–2 win, 2 points for winner team & 1 for loser team.

Championship playoffs is played to best of 3 games.

2014–15 season teams

Regular season standings

|}

Championship playoff

All times are CEST, except for Canary Islands which is WEST.

Bracket
To best of three games.

Semifinals

Match 1

|}

Match 2

|}

Match 3

|}

Final

Match 1

|}

Match 2

|}

Match 3

|}

Match 4

|}

Final MVP:  Sergio Luis Felix

Top scorers
(Regular season only.)

References

External links
Official website

2014 in volleyball
2015 in volleyball
Superliga de Voleibol Masculina 
2014 in Spanish sport  
2015 in Spanish sport